Rob Mastrianni is a New York City based musician and park ranger. Many of his performances involve collaborating with local bellydancers. The instruments he most often plays are combination electric sitar/guitars. He has also collaborated with many famous artists, and his music has been featured on The L Word.

He currently performs with the groups Next Tribe and Beatbox Guitar, with Pete List.

Partial discography

References

External links
 Official Site

Living people
Musicians from New York City
Place of birth missing (living people)
Year of birth missing (living people)